Slashchyovo is a rural locality (a village) in Lavrovskoye Rural Settlement, Sudogodsky District, Vladimir Oblast, Russia. The population was 21 as of 2010.

Geography 
Slashchyovo is located on the Sudogda River, 15 km north of Sudogda (the district's administrative centre) by road. Mikhalevo is the nearest rural locality.

References 

Rural localities in Sudogodsky District